A biological pathway is a series of interactions among molecules in a cell that leads to a certain product or a change in a cell. Such a pathway can trigger the assembly of new molecules, such as a fat or   protein. Pathways can also turn genes on and off, or spur a cell to move. Some of the most common biological pathways are involved in metabolism, the regulation of gene expression and the transmission of signals. Pathways play a key role in advanced studies of genomics.

Most common types of biological pathways:
Metabolic pathway
Genetic pathway
Signal transduction pathway

Pathways databases

 KEGG Pathway database is a popular pathway search database highly used by biologists.
 WikiPathways is a community curated pathway database using the "wiki" concept. All pathways have an open license and can be freely used.
 Reactome  is a free and manually curated online database of biological pathways.
 NCI-Nature Pathway Interaction Database is a free biomedical database of human cellular signaling pathways (new official name: NCI Nature Pathway Interaction Database: Pathway, synonym: PID).
 PhosphoSitePlus is a database of observed post-translational modifications in human and mouse proteins; an online systems biology resource providing comprehensive information and tools for the study of protein post-translational modifications (PTMs) including phosphorylation, ubiquitination, acetylation and methylation.
 BioCyc database collection is an assortment of organism specific Pathway/Genome Databases.
 Human Protein Reference Database is a centralized platform to visually depict and integrate information pertaining to domain architecture, post-translational modifications, interaction networks and disease association for each protein in the human proteome (the last release was #9 in 2010).
 PANTHER (Protein ANalysis THrough Evolutionary Relationships) is a large curated biological database of gene/protein families and their functionally related subfamilies that can be used to classify and identify the function of gene products.
 TRANSFAC (TRANScription FACtor database) is a manually curated database of eukaryotic transcription factors, their genomic binding sites and DNA binding profiles (provided by geneXplain GmbH).
 MiRTarBase is a curated database of MicroRNA-Target Interactions.
 DrugBank is a comprehensive, high-quality, freely accessible, online database containing information on drugs and drug targets.
 esyN is a network viewer and builder that allows to import pathways from the biomodels database or from biogrid, flybase pombase and see what drugs interact with the proteins in your network.
 Comparative Toxicogenomics Database (CTD) is a public website and research tool that curates scientific data describing relationships between chemicals/drugs, genes/proteins, diseases, taxa, phenotypes, GO annotations, pathways, and interaction modules; CTD illuminates how environmental chemicals affect human health.
 Pathway commons is a project and database that uses BioPAX language to convert, integrate and query other biological pathway and interaction databases.

See also 
 Proteostasis
 Cysteine metabolism
 Pathway analysis

Sources 

Molecular biology